"Bachatica" ("Little Bachata") is a song recorded by American singer Leslie Grace. it was released on September 30, 2021, by Sony Music Latin. It was her first bachata since 2015 due to the fact that she released singles for other genres from 2016 to 2021. This was also her first solo song since 2016.

Music video
The music video was released on the same day. It is inspired by the 1920s as it is the theme of the video.

Charts

References 

2021 singles
2021 songs
Bachata songs
Spanish-language songs
Sony Music Latin singles